The Women's 4 x 400 metres relay event  at the 2009 European Athletics Indoor Championships was held on March 8.

Results

References
Results

4 × 400 metres relay at the European Athletics Indoor Championships
2009 European Athletics Indoor Championships
2009 in women's athletics